WOCM (98.1 FM, "Ocean 98") is an AAA/Rock radio station in the Ocean City, Maryland, area.

The radio station's studios are located at Seacrets, a massive restaurant and nightclub campus located along Assawoman Bay in Ocean City.  The station features an eclectic mix of rock, reggae, and other modern hits, in a format not unlike a college radio station.

WOCM was one of the nation's first independent radio stations to broadcast over the Internet a live video feed of its jocks and visiting musical performers from its website.

History

WOCM is owned by Leighton Moore, who founded Seacrets in 1988, and is managed by David "Bulldog" Rothner, host of the station's "Rude Awakening Morning Show."

This station originally signed on the air at 97.9 FM with the call letters WSBL (Selbyville) and featured a country music format.

National talk radio personality Don Geronimo briefly hosted "Don Geronimo's Rockin' Soul Show" on WOCM, after having retired from the syndicated Don and Mike Show. The notoriously brusque deejay was fired by Rothner after a month on the air.

References

External links
WOCM official website

OCM
Adult album alternative radio stations in the United States
Radio stations established in 1965
Selbyville, Delaware
1965 establishments in Maryland